The following is a list of currently active amateur or professional open baseball teams in Australia.  It includes the league(s) they play for.

Australian Capital Territory

New South Wales

New South Wales Major League

Illawarra Baseball League

New South Wales Women's Baseball League

Northern Territory

Darwin Baseball League

Queensland

Greater Brisbane League

Gold Coast Winter League

Cairns Senior League

Far North Coast Major League

Other Clubs

South Australia

South Australian Baseball League

South Australia Women's Baseball League

Tasmania

Baseball Tasmania League

Victoria

Victorian Summer Baseball League (VSBL)

Melbourne Winter Baseball League

Dandenong Baseball Association – Winter

Bendigo Baseball Association – Winter

Geelong Baseball Association – Winter

Victorian Women's Baseball

Summer League (VSBL)

Western Australia

Western Australia State League
Yangebup Knights Bibra Lake Western Australia Mellar Park, White, Black and Gold

Provincial League

See also

List of Australian rules football clubs in Australia
List of cricket clubs in Australia
List of rowing clubs in Australia
List of rugby league clubs in Australia
List of rugby union clubs in Australia
List of soccer clubs in Australia
List of yacht clubs in Australia
Australia national baseball team
List of Major League Baseball players from Australia
Claxton Shield
Australian Baseball League (1989-1999)

References

 
Lists of sports teams in Australia
Australia